Wallace's owlet-nightjar (Aegotheles wallacii) is a species of bird in the family Aegothelidae. It is found in New Guinea.

It is named after Alfred Russel Wallace, a British naturalist, explorer, geographer, and biologist.

References

Wallace's owlet-nightjar
Birds of prey of New Guinea
Wallace's owlet-nightjar
Wallace's owlet-nightjar
Taxonomy articles created by Polbot